Hilander was a small chain of supermarkets in the metro area of Rockford, Illinois in the United States. The stores were operated by Schnucks, which acquired the chain from The Kroger Co. on September 21, 2011. As of May 2013, the stores have been rebranded to Schnucks.

History

Joseph Castrogiovanni and his wife Rose founded  Sanitary Meat Market in 1919. Castrogiovanni later renamed the chain Hilander. After a couple decades, their sons Alfred, Anthony, John, and Joseph, joined the family business. The Castrogiovanni family ran the Hilander Foods chain until 1997.

Kroger and Schnucks

On September 28, 1998, The Kroger Company of Cincinnati, Ohio, acquired the Hilander Foods chain. Kroger ran the chain under its Indianapolis-based Central Division which includes Pay Less Food Markets, Owen's Market, JayC Food Stores, and Scott's Food & Pharmacy. Alfred Castrogiovanni died in 2010, at age 87. In late 2011, The Kroger Co. sold the chain to Schnuck Markets, Inc., the owner of local rival Logli.  Schnucks kept running the stores under the Hilander Foods banner for a couple of years, but eventually rebranded the stores to Schnucks. In 2011, there were seven Hilander stores: five in Rockford, one in Cherry Valley, and one in Roscoe.

References

External links
 Schnucks Homepage

Companies based in Rockford, Illinois
Defunct supermarkets of the United States
Kroger
American companies established in 1919